The Lambky Liner is a motorcycle land-speed record streamliner designed by Navy veteran and Vincent motorcycle restorer Max Lambky from Kansas, United States.

Design and construction
World record holder Don Vesco consulted with Lambky on several features of streamliner design that Lambky utilized, including hub-center steering.

The streamliner is powered by dual alcohol-burning supercharged Vincent Motorcycles pushrod V-twin engines, built in 1949 and 1952. The total displacement is almost 2,000 cc running on alcohol, developing c. .

As of 2012, nine iterations of the streamliner had been built by Lambky, including a sidecar configuration.  Development costs were reported as $100,000 in 1997, and over $150,000 by 2008.

Riders
Riders included Don Angel, the first, who was recorded going  through the timing lights backwards in 2006, and Hartmut Weidelich, a German who also rebuilt the engines.

Records

References

Further reading

chassis: tow release, parachutes, tyres and wheels; 
drivetrain: engine coupling, clutch, jackshaft

steering: hubs, steering ratio and steering geometry;
chassis: aerodynamics;
engine: engine cooling; cylinder heads, valve train and timing; pistons, rods and crankpins; break-in; flywheels; oiling system; crankcases

transmission: air shifter;
engine: volumetric efficiency, fuel injection, nitrous

External links

Motorcycles designed by Don Vesco
Streamliner motorcycles
Motorcycles of the United States
Vincent motorcycles